The Men's 400m T12 had its first round held on September 11, beginning at 17:50. The Semifinals were held on September 12, at 18:20 and the Final was held on September 13 at 19:50.

Medalists

Results

References
Round 1 - Heat 1
Round 1 - Heat 2
Round 1 - Heat 3
Round 1 - Heat 4
Semifinals - Heat 1
Semifinals - Heat 2
Final A

Athletics at the 2008 Summer Paralympics